Robert Hatch is a game designer.

Robert Hatch may also refer to:
Robert McConnell Hatch (1910–2009), suffragan bishop of the Episcopal Diocese of Connecticut
Robert Hatch, character in The Alibi
Robert Hatch, character in Escape to Victory

See also
Bob Hatch (1879–1944), football coach